.հայ (hay, hye) is an Internet country code top-level domain (ccTLD) for Armenia, designated for two-letter country code AM, intended for domain names in the Armenian language.

Information 
The Internet Corporation for Assigned Names and Numbers (ICANN) made a decision on November 20, 2014 to register the .հայ domain name. Support for .հայ Armenian language domain names is intended to promote the use of the Armenian keyboard globally, drive support for Armenian fonts on modern mobile devices, and generally promote use of the Armenian language online.

A report published by the Internet Assigned Numbers Authority (IANA) which works with the US government and ICANN stated that, "as the current operator of .AM ccTLD, the application has provided satisfactory details on the technical and operational infrastructure and expertise that will be used to operate the .հայ domain."

The domain's punycode encoding is .xn--y9a3aq.

References

External links
 Armenia Network Information Centre
 .հայ Registrar
 Free .հայ domain registration

Internet in Armenia
Mass media in Armenia
հայ
Council of European National Top Level Domain Registries members
Computer-related introductions in 2014